U-49 may refer to one of the following German submarines:

 , a Type U 43 submarine launched in 1915 and that served in the First World War until sunk on 11 September 1917
 During the First World War, Germany also had these submarines with similar names:
 , a Type UB III submarine launched in 1917 and surrendered 16 January 1919; broken up at Swansea in 1922
 , a Type UC II submarine launched in 1916 and sunk on 8 August 1918
 , a Type VIIB submarine that served in the Second World War until sunk on 15 April 1940

Submarines of Germany